30 Minutes may refer to:

 30 Minutes (TV program), a newsmagazine for children and young adults from the late-1970s, produced by CBS News
 "30 Minutes" (song), a 2002 song from the Russian rock group t.A.T.u.
 30 Minutes (film), a Hindi film

See also